Gill Dennis (January 25, 1941 – May 13, 2015) was an American director and screenwriter.  He was the son of psychologist Wayne Dennis, author of "The Hopi Child."

Early life
Dennis graduated from AFI Conservatory’s first class (in 1969), which also included Tom Rickman, Terrence Malick, David Lynch and Caleb Deschanel.

Personal life and death
His first wife was actress Elizabeth Hartman, whom he divorced in 1984. He died in Portland, Oregon, and is survived by his wife, Kristen Peckinpah Dennis, and two sons.

Filmography
Director
 Without Evidence (1995)

Writer
 Return to Oz (1985)
 On My Own (1991)
 Without Evidence (1995)
 Walk the Line (2005)

References

External links

1941 births
2015 deaths
American male screenwriters
Writers from Charlottesville, Virginia
AFI Conservatory alumni
Film directors from Virginia
Screenwriters from Virginia